Pleurotomella elisa is a species of sea snail, a marine gastropod mollusk in the family Raphitomidae., order Neogastropoda, and Class Turridae.

Description

Distribution
This marine species occurs off the Agulhas Bank, South Africa

References

External links
 Thiele J., 1925. Gastropoden der Deutschen Tiefsee-Expedition. In:. Wissenschaftliche Ergebnisse der Deutschen Tiefsee-Expedition auf dem Dampfer "Valdivia" 1898–1899 II. Teil, vol. 17, No. 2, Gustav Fischer, Berlin
 

Endemic fauna of South Africa
elisa
Gastropods described in 1925